Pamparato is a comune (municipality) in the Province of Cuneo in the Italian region Piedmont, located about  south of Turin and about  southeast of Cuneo.

Pamparato borders the following municipalities: Garessio, Monasterolo Casotto, Roburent, Torre Mondovì, and Viola.

References

Cities and towns in Piedmont